Steven Royston Box (born 23 January 1967) is an English animator and director who works for Aardman Animations.

His early work in animation included the popular British claymation television series The Trap Door for Bristol-based animation studio CMTB Animation.

Box joined Aardman Animations in 1990. He directed the video for the Spice Girls' "Viva Forever" in 1998. He won a BAFTA Award in 1998 for his 11-minute animated film Stage Fright which he wrote, directed and produced. He also provided the voice for the character of Vince in the TV series Rex the Runt.

He was the key animator for Aardman's film Chicken Run and was an animator for the Wallace and Gromit films The Wrong Trousers and A Close Shave, before co-writing and co-directing the feature film Wallace & Gromit: The Curse of the Were-Rabbit with Nick Park. The film scooped his second BAFTA and his first Academy Award for Best Animated Feature. The film has also collected another 22 international awards and 12 other nominations for other awards. The film was a massive success at the Annie Awards where it won 10 Annie awards out of its 16 nominations.

In late 2017, Box was announced as the director behind the TV series, Moominvalley, based on the Moomins series. After a successful crowdfunding campaign, the series made its debut in 2019. In June 2022, it was announced that he is working on an original animated film for Netflix.

External links and references
 
 Four become five in virtual spice, BBC News, 21 June 1998.
 Animators prepare for the big day, BBC News, 4 March 2006.
 Aardman's Steve Box Talks, Animation World Magazine, 25 July 2002.

Specific

Living people
1967 births
English animators
Annie Award winners
British animated film directors
British film directors
Film people from Bristol
Aardman Animations people
Directors of Best Animated Feature Academy Award winners